Kareem Omolaja (born 18 February 1990) is a Nigerian professional footballer who last played as a defender for Shivaji Tarun Mandal Football Sangh.

Career

Mohammedan Sporting Club
In July 2015, Kareem signed for Kolkata giants Mohammedan where he was named Captain for 2015-16 season. In October Mohammedan participated in the 2015 Sheikh Kamal International Club Cup in Bangladesh under Kareem's leadership.

Minerva Academy FC
On 19 January 2016, Kareem signed for Minerva Academy F.C. prior to the final round of the 2015–16 I-League 2nd Division. On 10 May 2016, Kareem scored a hat-trick in his team's 3-2 win over Lonestar Kashmir FC at Srinagar, which was also his first in India, in the match Kareem has also captained the side. Kareem has scored another goal for his side on 19 May at Chandigarh, which gave Minerva a crucial win over Neroca FC.

Tollygunge Agragami FC
Kareem returned to Kolkata next season, and on 7 June 2016, he signed the contract at Tollygunge Agragami to play the Calcutta Football League 2016-17. Kareem made his first start for Tollygunge against Mohammedan Sporting on 9 August at Mohammedan Sporting Ground, where he scored one and provided the other to guide his team to a 2–1 victory.

Aizawl FC
Kareem on 14 July 2017 signed for I-League champions Aizawl FC.

Honours
JCT
Durand Cup runner-up: 2010

Minerva Academy
I-League 2nd Division runner-up: 2015–16

References

External links
 

1990 births
Living people
Nigerian footballers
Association football central defenders
JCT FC players
Mohammedan SC (Kolkata) players
RoundGlass Punjab FC players
Tollygunge Agragami FC players
Aizawl FC players
I-League players
Nigerian expatriate footballers
Expatriate footballers in India
Nigerian expatriate sportspeople in India